Nek Muhammad Wazir (Pashto/, also Nek Mohammed; 1975 – ) was a prominent Pakistani mujahideen or jihadi leader. He was killed in a US drone strike in South Waziristan, FATA, Pakistan in 2004. This was the first CIA drone strike inside Pakistan.

Early life
Nek Muhammad belonged to the Yargul Khail subclan of the Ahmadzai Wazir Pashtun tribe. According to Pakistan's Dawn News, his father: 

Nek's father, Nawaz Khan, was a member of the tribal elite and owned property in the village of Kalosha, South Waziristan, close to the Afghanistan border: Nek Muhammad was his second child. Muhammad was expelled from one madrassa for poor discipline. He received his early education at an Islamic school run by Jamiat-i-Ulema-i-Islam leader Noor Muhammad. 
Nek studied for five years at the Jamia Darul Uloom Waziristan. One of his teachers stated that he was a strong-willed student: 

He was later admitted to a college run by the Awami National Party (ANP), but did not complete his studies, choosing instead to start a shop in the main bazaar of Wana.

With the Taliban in  Afghanistan
During Nek Muhammad's childhood, Wana was a significant training base for mujahideen fighters in the 1980s Soviet–Afghan War. Around the age of 19, Muhammad joined the Taliban, recruited by his friend Mohammad Gul. He and Gul served with the forces of Saif-ur-Rehman Mansoor. He rose rapidly in the ranks, becoming a sub-commander of a Waziri Taliban unit, and fighting in battles against the Northern Alliance forces of Ahmad Shah Massoud in Bagram, Bamyan and Panjshir. He reportedly ultimately led a force of 3,000 Taliban at one time.

During this period he reportedly met al-Qaeda leader Osama bin Laden at the Rash Khor training camp, south of Kabul. He also met bin Laden's deputy, Ayman al-Zawahiri, and reportedly also became friends-in-arms with Taliban minister Mullah Nazir, the leader of the Islamic Movement of Uzbekistan, Tahir Yaldashev, and Uighur separatist leader Hasan Mahsum.

Return to Waziristan
After the Taliban regime fell in late 2001, Muhammad returned to Wana, where he reportedly facilitated the escape of many other Taliban and foreign fighters from Afghanistan.

Muhammad formed a new organization called Jaishul al-Qiba al-Jihadi al-Siri al-Alami. This group allegedly ran training camps in South Waziristan for the Taliban and Al-Qaeda, and produced anti-Western literature and videos for indoctrination purposes. He reportedly became quite wealthy at this time, owning over 40 vehicles by December 2003.

Some members of this group were also recruited into Jundullah, a militant anti-government organization. Jundullah members Attaur Rehman and Abu Musab al-Balochi (al-Baloshi) would later be implicated in the attempted assassination of a senior military official in Karachi. Jundullah's media studio, Ummat, was allegedly connected with Al-Qaeda's media front organization, the Al-Sahab Foundation, and Jundullah itself with Al-Qaeda leader Khalid Shaikh Mohammed. Ummat also produced anti-Western and anti-government videos.

In April 2004, Muhammed, as leader of anti-government militant forces in South Waziristan fighting in the Waziristan War, accepted an offer of a cease-fire and amnesty with Pakistani forces. The ceasefire lasted only briefly before conflict resumed, however.

Death
At the time of his death Mohammad was accused of having provided a safe haven for Taliban and al Qaeda fighters, and also to fighters from Chechnya and other conflicts. When he was killed the Voice of America called Mohammad an "al Qaida facilitator".

Only a day after the famous Shakai agreement with Pakistan's military in April 2004, in a long interview with the Voice of America Pashto Correspondent Mukhtar Ahmad, Nek Mohammad disclosed that he would never abandon his jihad against the US and other allied forces in Afghanistan. A few miles away from Wana, in this face-to-face radio interview, Mohammad vowed to continue his support for Al-Qaeda and Taliban, and argued that no peace agreement with the Pakistani government can compel him to force the Al-Qaeda fighters and other foreign militants to leave the Pakistan's tribal area.

Despite Nek Mohammad's hatred for the US and Western media, he often appeared on their Pashto channels. He had stated on several occasions that VOA and Radio Azadi were the mouthpieces of US government, and that its broadcasters and reporters are the 'paid agents' or 'spies' for the US.

On 18 June 2004, after signing the Shakai Peace deal, he was killed in a missile attack. The Pakistani army stated that it was responsible for Muhammad's death, but PBS Frontline reported in 2006 that he had actually been killed along with four other suspected militants and two children by a missile from an American Predator UAV, allegedly as they sat eating dinner. According to Mark Mazzetti, author of The Way of the Knife: The CIA, a Secret Army, and a War at the Ends of the Earth, the killing of Nek Muhammed, who had been marked by Pakistan as an enemy of the state, was a condition for a secret deal between the United States and Pakistan to allow the use by the CIA of drones in Pakistan airspace to kill individuals designated as enemies of the US.

According to Asad Durrani, a retired 3-star rank general and former director-general of the Pakistan Army's Military Intelligence, Mohammad was killed by an American drone.

References

1975 births
2004 deaths
Deaths by drone strikes of the Central Intelligence Agency in Pakistan
Pashtun people
Tehrik-i-Taliban Pakistan members
Taliban leaders
People from South Waziristan